Voelcker(s)/Völcker(s) (or Volcker) is a surname, and may refer to:
Augustus Voelcker (1822–1884), German-born English agricultural chemist
Francis William Voelcker (1896–1954), British army officer
John Augustus Voelcker (1854–1937), English agricultural chemist and son of Augustus Voelcker
Paul Völckers (1891–1946), German general
John Voelcker (1927–1972), British architect and designer
Paul Volcker (1927–2019), American economist, former Federal Reserve Chairman

Surnames from given names